Aragats, is a village in the Armavir Province of Armenia. The village's church, dedicated to Saint Stepanos, dates to 1870. There is a Urartian fortress nearby.

See also 
Armavir Province

References 

World Gazeteer: Armenia – World-Gazetteer.com

Populated places in Armavir Province